Ada Bojana (Albanian: Ishulli i Bunës) is an island in the Ulcinj Municipality in Montenegro. The name Ada means river island in Serbo-Croatian.

The island is created by a river delta of the Bojana River.  It is located on the southernmost tip of Montenegro, with the Bojana river separating it from Pulaj and Velipojë in the Albanian territory.

The island is of triangular shape, bordered from two sides by the Bojana river and by the Adriatic Sea from the southwest. It has an area of 4.8 square km.

Ada Bojana offers kitesurfing and windsurfing locations on the Adriatic Coast due to the strong cross onshore winds during summer afternoons. Ada Bojana's main income is from Camping. 

The New York Times included Ada Bojana and Montenegro's South Coast (including Velika Plaža and Hotel Mediteran) in a ranking of top travel destinations for 2010 – "Top Places to Go in 2010".

FKK Resort Ada Bojana
Naturist Island Ada Bojana (Ada Buna) is a place for nude tourists. The first phase of Ada, which was constructed in 1972, provides 83 small houses overlooking the Adriatic Sea with a capacity of 320 beds. The hotel complex is located on the southwest side of the island. Nudist Island of Bojana (Buna) is located 15 km away from Ulcinj, notable for its untouched nature. Although in the Mediterranean region, Ada's dominant climate is subtropical.

References

External links 

 Ada Bojana Transfer
 Ada Bojana Ulcinj
 Discover Ada Bojana
 Website about Ada Bojana
 Blog about Ada Bojana

Islands of Montenegro
Beaches of Montenegro
Ulcinj